Nesophlox is a genus in the family of Hummingbirds. It consists of two endemic hummingbirds of the Bahamas.

Species
The genus contains two species:

These species were formerly placed in the genus Calliphlox. Molecular phylogenetic studies published in 2014 and 2017 found that the genus Calliphlox was polyphyletic. In the revised classification to create monophyletic genera, the Bahama woodstar and the Inagua woodstar were moved to the resurrected genus Nesophlox that had been introduced by Robert Ridgway in 1910.

References

Nesophlox
Bird genera
Higher-level bird taxa restricted to the West Indies